Ardrossan Winton Pier railway station served the town of Ardrossan and its harbour, North Ayrshire, Scotland. The station allowed train passengers to link with the Caledonian MacBrayne (CalMac) ferry sailings to Brodick on the Isle of Arran and other destinations.

History 
The station was opened on 27 July 1840 as part of the Ardrossan Railway (later merged with the Glasgow and South Western Railway) and was known as Ardrossan Pier. Upon the grouping of the G&SWR into the London, Midland and Scottish Railway during the Grouping of 1923, the station was renamed Ardrossan Winton Pier on 2 June 1924 in order to distinguish between the Ardrossan Pier station on the former Lanarkshire and Ayrshire Railway (which was renamed Ardrossan Montgomerie Pier). 
The station then passed on to the Scottish Region of British Railways on nationalisation in 1948.

The station had a single island platform. With the closure of Montgomerie Pier station on 6 May 1968, Winton Pier station became the sole passenger rail terminus at the harbour. When sectorisation was introduced in the 1980s, the station was briefly served by ScotRail before closing, replaced by Ardrossan Harbour railway station (situated slightly further inland) on 19 January 1987 upon the commencement of electric services.
Train services in connection with the sailings of Burns and Laird Lines to Belfast and Isle of Man Steam Packet Company to Douglas, Isle of Man ceased in 1976 and  1985, respectively, when the shipping routes closed.

The site of the station is now located behind the main CalMac ferry terminal building. Only the outline of where the platform was once located remains.

References

Notes

Sources 
 
 
 Stations on navigable O.S. map. Used (on map) station at end of branch south of harbour entrance'

Disused railway stations in North Ayrshire
Railway stations in Great Britain opened in 1840
Railway stations in Great Britain closed in 1987
1840 establishments in Scotland
1987 disestablishments in Scotland
Former Glasgow and South Western Railway stations
Ardrossan−Saltcoats−Stevenston